WPAD (1560 AM) is a radio station broadcasting a sports format. Licensed to Paducah, Kentucky, United States.  The station is owned by the Bristol Broadcasting Company, Inc.

WPAD is the fifth oldest radio broadcasting station in Kentucky, founded in 1930 by Pierce Lackey. It broadcast on 1420 kHz with a 100 watt signal. In 1941 the power was increased to 250 watts, and the frequency was changed to 1450 kHz. In 1943 the station joined the CBS radio network. In 1946 WPAD added the first FM broadcasting in the state, continuing with FM simulcast until the 1970s. In 1962, the power was increased to 1,000 watts. In 1967 Lackey died and the station was purchased by Ed Fritts. In the 1970s the FM call letters were changed to WDDJ and the FM programming was changed to progressive rock.

In 1984 the stations were sold to Bill Bereman of Indianapolis. Bereman soon sold them to Lee Hagan. In 1996, the stations were purchased by Bristol Broadcasting, owner of WKYX and WKYQ. WPAD exchanging frequencies with WDXR, and continued to operate on 1560 kHz with an "oldies" format.

On October 22, 2014, WPAD was granted a Federal Communications Commission construction permit to decrease day power to 1,000 watts and decrease night power to 35 watts. The license to cover for the new facility was granted on April 28, 2017.

1560 AM is a United States clear-channel frequency; KNZR and WFME share Class A status on this frequency.

Programming

Weekdays
Erik Kuselias – The Erik Kuselias Show – 5a-6a 
The Jeff Bidwell Show – 6a-9a
Kentucky Sports Radio – 9a-11a
The Dan Patrick Show – 11a-2p (Tape Delayed)
The Rich Eisen Show – 2p-5p (Tape Delayed)
Steve Gorman Sports – 5p-7p
J.T. The Brick w/ Tomm Looney – 7p-10p
The Jason Smith Show w/ Mike Harmon - 10p-1a
The Ben Maller Show w/ Eddie Garcia – 1a-5a

Special Programming
McCracken County High School Sports
Live Church Programming (Sundays 10a-Noon)
Nashville Predators (limited) NHL
Tennessee Titans NFL
Marshall Toy Sports Show (Mondays 5p-7p)

References

External links

PAD
CBS Sports Radio stations
Sports radio stations in the United States
Radio stations established in 1941